Idalus affinis is a moth of the family Erebidae. It was described by Rothschild in 1917. It is found in Brazil (Santa Catharina).

References

 Natural History Museum Lepidoptera generic names catalog

affinis
Moths described in 1917